The Valley Heights Rail Museum is a railway museum located in Valley Heights, New South Wales, Australia. The museum is operated by two partner organisations:

 The Valley Heights Locomotive Depot Heritage Museum, is the Blue Mountains Division of Transport Heritage New South Wales.
 The Valley Heights Steam Tramway (a business name of the Steam Tram and Railway Preservation (Co-op) Society) is the operator of historic steam trams and trains within the former locomotive depot.

Locomotive depot

The heritage-listed locomotive depot was constructed in 1913 when the duplication of the Main Western railway line between Emu Plains and Glenbrook was completed. The depot was available for service from December 1913, but was not officially opened until 31 January 1914. With the duplication and regrading of the line, the heavy grades below Valley Heights were eliminated, the ruling gradient from Penrith to Valley Heights being 1 in 60.

The depot at Valley Heights consisted of a locomotive yard, a 10 bay roundhouse,  turntable, an elevated coal stage, and water tanks and columns. It provided bank engines for trains travelling to Katoomba and beyond. The engines at Valley Heights not only banked over the longest distance in NSW, but also had the envious distinction of having to operate over the longest continual and most steeply graded mainline in Australia. The 33 kilometre section from Valley Heights to Katoomba rises 670 metres, with a ruling gradient of 1 in 33.

During the steam era, the depot had a continual allotment of eight freight and two passenger engines. During the peak of the steam era, an average of 30 trains during any 24-hour period required banking from Valley Heights to Katoomba.

The line was electrified to Valley Heights in October 1956. In February 1957, steam operations from Valley Heights were replaced by the 46 class electric locomotives.

The depot in latter years was an electric locomotive and freight wagon repair workshop, the electric engines receiving everything from minor repairs to complete overhauls at the depot. A variety of freight wagons were also repaired. The demise of Valley Heights depot began when the more powerful 85 class locomotives were introduced in 1979. The demise was accelerated with the introduction of the 86 class locomotives in early 1983. From the mid-1980s, the number of trains requiring banking from Valley Heights had been reduced to a handful each day, the number of locomotives required for this duty being reduced to three, sometimes as few as two being necessary.

In October 1988, it was announced the depot would close. One electric locomotive remained available for any bank work necessary, until the last week of January 1989, when 4627 had the distinction operating the last train to be banked from Valley Heights to Katoomba.

Milestones included:

1911 – railway station destroyed by bushfire
1912 – repairs to railway station buildings destroyed by bushfire 
1914 – new roundhouse and depot brought into use 
1924 – additional water supplies at depot 
1925 – improvements to facilities, including ash tunnel for locomotive ash handling 
1949 – upgrading facilities for crew amenities 
1953 – the only fatality in the depot's history when Hendrikus Trip killed walking on the main line
1957 – electric locomotives take over from steam locomotives as bank engines 
1960s – improvements to allow for servicing and repairs to electric locomotives, members room/meal room, visitor centre and refreshment rooms added 
1973 – machine workshop annex added 
1987 – the first floor level of brickwork at signal box was removed in 1987 and extension added 
1988 – reduced use of bank engines as larger electric locomotives are used on main line work 
1992 – footbridge, upgrading work, concrete deck and stairs 
1993 – depot closed 
1990s – extensive repairs to roundhouse
2014 – centenary of depot and official opening of museum by Governor Marie Bashir
2017 – sesqui centenary of opening western line to Weatherboard (now Wentworth Falls)
2018 – major renovation of roundhouse forecourt
2021 – new steel and concrete retaining wall

Museum
In 1994, the Blue Mountains Division of the New South Wales Rail Transport Museum (now Transport Heritage NSW) established the Valley Heights Locomotive Depot Railway Museum, with the aim of preserving the depot to provide historical, educational and recreational facilities and opportunities for the benefit of the Blue Mountains community and visitor to the region.

Following the destruction of the Parramatta Park Tramway by fire in June 1993, the Valley Heights Steam Tramway was established in 1997 by the Stream Tram and Railway Preservation (Co-Op) Society Limited and its remaining assets were also transferred to Valley Heights.

In 2007/08, the museum built a new work shed constructed near ash disposal tunnel, former amenities building (refreshment room and visitor centre) repaired and refurbished, ongoing work in roundhouse, chargeman's office (museum) repaired and refurbished, ash disposal tunnel cleaned and restored, amenities (toilets) were repaired and refurbished.

Heritage status
Together with the Valley Heights railway station, the locomotive depot was listed on the New South Wales State Heritage Register on 2 April 1999. The depot is considered "of state significance as an important locomotive depot, and the principal service and maintenance facility for bank engines working over the Main Western line between Sydney and Lithgow for almost 80 years".

Valley Heights Steam Tram Rolling Stock displayed and operated at the museum is also listed on the State Heritage Register as 'collection of steam tram rolling stock is of state historical significance as a remnant of the steam tram network in operation in NSW between the 1880s and the 1930s'.

Centenary
On 31 January 2014, the museum celebrated the centenary of the opening of the depot, with a special ceremony featuring speeches from the NSW governor Marie Bashir and NSW premier Barry O'Farrell. The governor formally opened the museum  during this event, which received extensive coverage on local and state media.

Museum exhibits

The museum's collection of railway locomotives, carriages, wagons and other railway equipment includes:

The museum publishes historical and technical details of exhibits on its website.

References

External links
Valley Heights Rail Museum website
Valley Heights Locomotive Depot Heritage Museum
Valley Heights Steam Tramway, a business name of the Steam Tram and Railway Preservation (Co=Op) Society Ltd 

Museums in New South Wales
Museums established in 1994
Railway museums in New South Wales
Railway roundhouses in Australia
Tourist railways in New South Wales
1994 establishments in Australia
Valley Heights, New South Wales
Buildings and structures in the Blue Mountains (New South Wales)
History of the Blue Mountains (New South Wales)